Morlunda may refer to:

Mörlunda, is a locality situated in Hultsfred Municipality, Kalmar County, Sweden 
Morlunda (Greenbrier County, West Virginia), listed on the National Register of Historic Places in Greenbrier County, West Virginia
Morlunda, West Virginia, an unincorporated community